Jane Louise Curry, born September 24, 1932, in East Liverpool, Ohio, is a prolific author of adventure, fantasy, mystery, time travel, and American Indian tales for older children and teenagers. She has written 39 books.

Her novels include the famous Abaloc series, set in the magical landscape of the Ohio Valley and surrounding regions in contemporary, medieval, and prehistoric times.

Bibliography

Abaloc series
 Beneath the Hill 1967
 The Change-Child 1969
 The Daybreakers 1970
 Over the Sea's Edge  1971
 The Watchers 1975
 The Birdstones 1977
 The Wolves of Aam 1981
 Shadow Dancers 1983

Smith Family series
 The Big Smith Snatch 1989
 The Great Smith House Hustle 1993

Collections
 Down from the Lonely Mountain: California Indian Tales 1965
 Back in the Beforetime: Tales of the California Indians 1987
 Turtle Island: Tales of the Algonquian Nation 1999
 The Wonderful Sky Boat: And Other Native American Tales of the Southeast 2001
 Hold Up the Sky: And Other Native American Tales from Texas and the Southern Plains 2003

 The Sleepers 1968
 Mindy's Mysterious Miniature 1970
 The Housenapper 1971
 The Ice Ghosts Mystery 1972
 The Lost Farm 1974
 Parsley Sage, Rosemary & Time 1975
 The Magical Cupboard 1976
 Poor Tom's Ghost 1977
 The Bassumtyte Treasure 1978
 Ghost Lane 1979
 The Great Flood Mystery 1985
 The Lotus Cup 1986
 Me, Myself, and I 1987
 Little, Little Sister 1988
 What the Dickens 1991
 The Christmas Knight 1993
 Robin Hood and His Merry Men 1994
 Robin Hood in the Greenwood 1995
 Moon Window 1996
 Dark Shade 1998
 A Stolen Life 1999
 The Egyptian Box 2002
 Brave Cloelia 2004 (illustrated by Jeff Crosby)
 The Black Canary 2005

References

External links

 

 

1932 births
20th-century American novelists
21st-century American novelists
American children's writers
American women novelists
American fantasy writers
American mystery writers
People from East Liverpool, Ohio
Novelists from Ohio
Living people
American women children's writers
Women science fiction and fantasy writers
Women mystery writers
20th-century American women writers
21st-century American women writers